Trikkatiri is a town in Kerala state,  India.

History
As per the legend, once a lady working on the field, being tired and disappointed, sat on a rock where the Temple stands today and started to sharpen her sickle on the rock. While sharpening the sickle, drops of blood began to ooze from the rock. Frightened, the she called for the help and started running with fear. When people gathered, they saw an idol of god standing on the rock. It was an idol of three faces representing Lord Vishnu, Lord Brahma and Lord Shiva. Later a temple was built on this rock. This is the only temple of its kind having three gods in the same Sree Kovil. Jaya bhali and Shiva rathri are the important festivals being celebrated here.

Temples
Thrikkattiri temple originally belonged to Trikatiri Nair veed at Trikatiri. As the story further goes, once a very old brahmin came to visit Trikateri Nair Veed Mooppil Nair (the senior most person in the family). After the lunch they were engaged in discussing various places travelled by the brahmin during his pilgrimage. As the discussion progressed, the brahmin expressed an interest in buying the Moonummorthy temple. The Mooppil Nair laughed at his proposition and challenged him. He told the brahmin that if he can give 1000 gold coins immediately it can be given. The brahmin took his walking stick, opened the lid at one end, and emptied the gold coins kept hidden inside. The Mooppil Nair has to stand by his word and he has to hand over the temple to the brahmin. That is how the ownership of Moonnumoorthy temple was transferred to Moothrigkot Mana, one of the oldest and wealthy bramhin family of Kerala.

Legends
Another story is that, one hungry Brahmin came to the temple hoping to have prasadm and lunch. Just before having his food, he asked to whom the temple belonged, When he heard that the owners were the Family of Nair Veedu, the Brahmin got up without eating, telling that he, being a Brahman, cannot eat from a temple owned by any Nair family. When the moopil air (the senior most member of the family ) heard it, he immediately rushed to meet the Brahmin to  persuade  him not to leave without food. To ensure that he met the condition of the Brahmin, the tharavad karanavar on the spot gifted the temple to the nearest Brahmin family, the moothringode mana, the temple by taking an oath in front of the temple lamp. The brahmin was pleased and left after eating his lunch. That's how the ownership was changed to the moothringode mana.

Puthur Madam
The lofty roof of the large house, seen at the righthand corner in the above  picture of the temple, is Puthur Madham. "Ms Kunhanujathi Nethiar avarkal" is the senior most noble lady of that house of many illustrious members. Nairs in Kerala follow the  matrilineal system where the senior most lady wields equal authority in all family matters and holds most of family lands. Kunjanujathi Nethiar Avarkal remained a prominent devotee of the temple throughout her life.

Transportation
This town connects to other parts of India through Palakkad city. National Highway No.544 connects to Coimbatore and Bangalore. Other parts of Kerala is accessed through National Highway No.66 going through Thrissur. Calicut International Airport, Cochin International Airport and Coimbatore Airport are the nearest airports. Shoranur Junction railway station is the nearest major railway station.

References 

Cities and towns in Palakkad district